Wildlife of Myanmar includes its flora and fauna and their natural habitats.

Flora 

Like all Southeastern Asian forests, the forests of Myanmar can be divided into two categories: monsoon forest and rainforest. Monsoon forest is dry at least three months a year, and is dominated by deciduous trees. Myanmar's monsoon forest ecoregions are the  Rainforest has a rainy season of at least nine months, and are dominated by broadleaf evergreen. 

In the region north of the Tropic of Cancer, in the Himalayan region, subtropical broadleaf evergreen dominates to an elevation of 2000m, and from 2000m to 3000m, semi-deciduous broadleaf dominates, and above 3000m, evergreen conifers and subalpine forest are the primary fauna until the alpine scrubland.

The area from Yangon to Myitkyina is mostly monsoon forest, while peninsular Malaysia south of Mawlamyine is primarily rainforest, with some overlap between the two. Along the coasts of Rakhine State and Tanintharyi Division, tidal forests occur in estuaries, lagoons, tidal creeks, and low islands. These forests are host to the much-depleted Myanmar Coast mangroves habitat of mangrove and other trees that grow in mud and are resistant to sea water. Forests along the beaches consist of palm trees, hibiscus, casuarinas, and other trees resistant to storms.

Fauna 
Myanmar is home to nearly 300 known mammal species, 300 reptile species, and about 1000 bird species. There is also number of non-marine molluscs in Myanmar.

See also
 Deforestation in Myanmar

References

Sources

External links
 "Online Photo Galleries" on Nature and Wildlife of India at "India Nature Watch (INW)" - spreading the love of nature and wildlife in India through photography

Myanmar
Biota of Myanmar